The following is a list of all team-to-team transactions that have occurred in the National Hockey League during the 1983–84 NHL season. It lists what team each player has been traded to, signed by, or claimed by, and for which player(s) or draft pick(s), if applicable.

Trades between teams

June

July

August

September

October

November

December

January

February

March 
 Trading Deadline: March 6, 1984 

  Trade completed on May 1, 1984.

References

Additional sources
 hockeydb.com - search for player and select "show trades"
 

National Hockey League transactions
1983–84 NHL season